Alan Reed (born Herbert Theodore Bergman; August 20, 1907 – June 14, 1977) was an American actor, best known as the original voice of Fred Flintstone on The Flintstones and various spinoff series. He also appeared in many films, including Days of Glory,  The Tarnished Angels, Breakfast at Tiffany's, Viva Zapata! (as Pancho Villa), and Nob Hill, and various television and radio  series.

Early years
Alan  Reed was born Herbert Theodore Bergman on August 20, 1907, in New York City to Jewish parents. His father was a Lithuanian-Jewish immigrant and his mother was born in the United States to Ukrainian-Jewish parents from Galicia. He attended George Washington High School (now George Washington Educational Campus) and majored in journalism at Columbia University. 

Between graduating from WHS and entering Columbia, he studied drama at the American Academy of Dramatic Arts. He began his acting career in the city, eventually working on Broadway.

For several years, Reed toured in vaudeville with his cousin, Harry Green. He also had two other jobs—operating a wholesale candy factory and working at the Copake Country Club as "social director, entertainment producer and actor".

Career

Radio and stage
As early as 1930, Reed (billed as Teddy Bergman) co-starred with Herbert Polesie in Henry and George, a CBS program that featured "minute dramas, popular laughmakers ... interspersed with dance music selections".

Reed's radio work included having two roles in Valiant Lady, the role of Solomon Levy on Abie's Irish Rose, as the "Allen's Alley" resident poet Falstaff Openshaw on Fred Allen's NBC radio show, and later on his own five-minute show, Falstaff's Fables, on ABC, as Officer Clancey and other occasional roles on the NBC radio show Duffy's Tavern, as Shrevey the driver on several years of The Shadow, as Chester Riley's boss on the NBC radio show The Life of Riley, as Italian immigrant Pasquale in Life with Luigi on CBS radio, various supporting roles on Yours Truly, Johnny Dollar and The Phil Harris-Alice Faye Show, and as Lt. Walter Levinson in several episodes of Richard Diamond, Private Detective.

Reed was "heard regularly on the Crime Doctor series," and "was the original Daddy to Fanny Brice on Baby Snooks". Billed as Teddy Bergman, he had the title role on Joe Palooka.

Billed as Teddy Bergman, Reed appeared on Broadway in Double Dummy (1936), and A House in the Country (1937), and Love's Old Sweet Song (1940).

Television and later roles
From 1957 to 1958, Reed appeared in a recurring role as J.B. Hafter, a studio boss, on the CBS sitcom Mr. Adams and Eve. He also played the same character in The Bob Cummings Show. In 1963, he appeared as Councilman Jack Gramby in episode 8 of the CBS sitcom My Favorite Martian. In 1964–65, he had a recurring role as Mr. Swidler in the ABC sitcom Mickey.

Voice acting
In animation, Reed provided the voice of Boris the Russian Wolfhound in Walt Disney's Lady and the Tramp in 1955. In 1960, he began the voice role for Fred Flintstone, the lead character of Hanna-Barbera's prime-time animated series The Flintstones. Reed provided Fred's voice for the entire six-season run of the show, as well as in several spin-off series (The Pebbles and Bamm-Bamm Show, The Flintstone Comedy Hour) and specials. His final performance as Fred Flintstone was a cameo guest role on an episode of Scooby's All-Star Laff-A-Lympics. Among his other voice roles for Hanna-Barbera was Touché Turtle's sidekick, Dum Dum.

Radio playwright and director Norman Corwin cast Reed as Santa Claus in the 1969 KCET television reading of his 1938 play The Plot to Overthrow Christmas.

In television commercials Reed was the voice over for J.J. Keebler, a creation of the Leo Burnett Agency.

Personal life
In May 1932, Reed married the former Finette Walker (1909–2005), a Broadway actress whom he met at television station W2XAB (later WCBS-TV) in New York City. She appeared on stage in the early 1930s and was a chorus member in the original 1934 Broadway production of Anything Goes with Ethel Merman. They had three sons, including actor Alan Reed, Jr. (born 1936).

Death
Reed, a smoker, was diagnosed with bladder cancer in 1967. The cancer was treated surgically, but he later developed emphysema. On June 14, 1977, he died at St. Vincent Medical Center (Los Angeles) after having a heart attack, two months before his 70th birthday.

Filmography

Film

Television

Radio

Theatre

References

Further reading
Reed, Alan. The Alan Reed Story. Albany, Georgia: BearManor Media, 2009. 
Terrace, Vincent.  Radio Programs, 1924–1984.  Jefferson, NC: McFarland, 1999.

External links

 (billed as Teddy Bergman)

1907 births
1977 deaths
American male film actors
American male television actors
American male voice actors
American male stage actors
American male radio actors
American people of Lithuanian-Jewish descent
American people of Ukrainian-Jewish descent
George Washington Educational Campus alumni
Jewish American male actors
Male actors from New York City
American Academy of Dramatic Arts alumni
Columbia University alumni
Hanna-Barbera people
20th-century American male actors
20th-century American Jews